Tanika Charles is a Canadian soul and rhythm and blues singer, who released her full-length debut album Soul Run in 2016.

Formerly based in Edmonton, Alberta, Charles moved to Toronto, Ontario in the late 2000’s after an opportunity to sing backing vocals for Bedouin Soundclash was offered. Since then, Tanika has performed as a backing vocalist for Johnny Reid, Serena Ryder, Emmanuel Jal, and many others. Tanika performed as a solo artist under the stage name Ms. Chawlz, before releasing her debut EP What! What? What!? in 2010.

She released "Soul Run", the title track from her full-length album, as a preview single in fall 2015, and followed up with "Two Steps" in April 2016. Both singles were playlisted on CBC Radio 2, and charted on the Radio 2 Top 20. The full album was released on May 10, and was supported by her first extensive concert tour and an advance appearance on CBC Radio One's Q. In June, the album was named to the longlist for the 2016 Polaris Music Prize, and in 2017 it was shortlisted for the Juno Award for R&B/Soul Recording of the Year at the Juno Awards of 2017.

Charles has also appeared on television both as a reoccurring guest on CBC Kids, and as a lounge singer on the Global drama series Bomb Girls. Her music has been featured on HBO Canada's Less Than Kind, Global's Rookie Blue, Citytv's Seed, and CTV's Saving Hope.

In 2019, Charles released her second album, The Gumption, on Record Kicks.

Discography

Albums

EPs

Singles

Music videos

Awards and nominations

References

External links
Tanika Charles at CBC Music

Canadian soul singers
Canadian contemporary R&B singers
21st-century Black Canadian women singers
Musicians from Edmonton
Musicians from Toronto
Living people
Year of birth missing (living people)